Saddam Emiruddin Gaffar (born 24 September 2001) is an Indonesian professional footballer who plays as a centre-forward for Liga 1 club PSS Sleman and the Indonesia national team.

Club career

PSS Sleman
Gaffar made his first-team debut for Sleman in the 2021 Menpora Cup, a pre-season tournament ahead of the 2021 Liga 1 season, in which he scored two goals.

International career
Gaffar debuted for the Indonesia U-19 team in the 2019 AFF U-19 Youth Championship and scored his first goal for the U-19 squad when it faced Saudi Arabia U-19 in a friendly on 11 September 2020. He received a call to join the senior Indonesian national football team in May 2021. 

He earned his first senior cap in a 25 May 2021 friendly match in Dubai against Afghanistan.

Career statistics

Club

International

Honours 
PSS Sleman
 Menpora Cup third place: 2021

Indonesia U-19
 AFF U-19 Youth Championship third place: 2019

References

External links 
 Saddam Gaffar at Liga Indonesia
 

2001 births
Living people
Indonesian footballers
Association football forwards
Indonesia international footballers
Indonesia youth international footballers
Liga 1 (Indonesia) players
PSS Sleman players
People from Jepara
Sportspeople from Central Java